"You Ought To Know..." is the title of a promotional tour single by Phil Collins, which he released during his 1997 Trip into the Light World Tour. It was sold exclusively throughout all shows of the European leg of the tour.

The single included "Oughta Know by Now" and "Wear My Hat" from the album Dance into the Light. The single also included "It's Over" and "I Don't Want to Go", B-sides on "Dance into the Light" and "It's in Your Eyes" singles, respectively, and two unreleased songs.

Toyota sponsored the single with their logo featured on the single cover of all CDs. This was because they were the main sponsors on the European leg of the tour.

Track listing
"Oughta Know By Now"
"I Don't Want to Go"
"Another Time"
"It's Over"
"It's Everywhere"
"Wear My Hat"

Credits 
 Phil Collins – drums, vocals, keyboards 
 Brad Cole – strings
 Daryl Stuermer – lead guitar
 Ronnie Caryl – rhythm guitar
 Nathan East – bass
 Amy Keys – backing vocals
 Arnold McCuller – backing vocals
 Vine Street Horns
 Andrew Woolfolk – saxophones
 Arturo Velasco – trombone
 Harry Kim – trumpet
 Daniel Fornero – trumpet

External links
 "You Ought To Know..." on Discogs

1997 singles
Phil Collins songs
Songs written by Phil Collins
1996 songs
Atlantic Records singles
Song recordings produced by Hugh Padgham
Virgin Records singles
Song recordings produced by Phil Collins